Valdetorres de Jarama is a municipality of the Community of Madrid, Spain.

Sights include the Church of la Natividad de Nuestra Señora.

References

Municipalities in the Community of Madrid